Oscar Cullmann (25 February 1902, Strasbourg – 16 January 1999, Chamonix) was a French Lutheran theologian. He is best known for his work in the ecumenical movement and was partly responsible for the establishment of dialogue between the Lutheran and Roman Catholic traditions. Because of his intense ecumenical work, Cullmann's Basel colleague Karl Barth joked with him that his tombstone would bear the inscription "advisor to three popes."

Biography 
Cullmann was born in Strasbourg (then in Germany) and studied classical philology and theology at the seminary there. In 1926, he accepted an assistant professorship, a position previously held by Albert Schweitzer.

In 1930, he was awarded a full professorship of New Testament. From 1936, he also taught the history of the early church. In 1938, he began teaching both subjects at Basel Reformed Seminary. In 1948 Cullmann accepted a position teaching theology in Paris at the Sorbonne while he continued at Basel. He retired from both in 1972.

He was elected a foreign member of the Royal Netherlands Academy of Arts and Sciences in 1960.

He was invited to be an observer at the Second Vatican Council.

Upon his death at 96, the World Council of Churches issued a special tribute to Cullmann to honour his ecumenical work.

Theology 
Cullmann's studies on Christian eschatology and Christology drove him to propose a third position over against the popular positions of C. H. Dodd and Albert Schweitzer, known as "redemptive history" or "inaugurated eschatology". He wrote that Jesus Christ was the midpoint of sacred history, which informs general history and runs linearly from creation to consummation. He stressed the objective reality of sacred history against the existentialist interpretation of Rudolf Bultmann, a fellow German theologian. Cullmann suggested the analogy of D-Day and VE-Day to illustrate the relationship between Jesus' death and resurrection on the one hand, and his parousia on the other.

Selected works 
Among Cullmann's important works are:

  - (trans from the Zürich: Zwingli-Verlag, 1948 1st edition).
  - (trans from the Zollikon-Zürich: Evangelischer Verlag a. g., 1946 1st edition).
  - (trans from the Basel & Zürich, 1944 1st edition).
  - (trans from the Zürich : Zwingli, 1952 1st edition).
 
  - (trans from the Kampen: Kok, 1911 1st edition).
  - (trans from the Tübingen: J.C.B. Mohr (Paul Siebeck), 1965 1st edition).

References

External links 

 

1902 births
1999 deaths
Clergy from Strasbourg
20th-century Protestant theologians
French Lutheran theologians
20th-century French theologians
Academic staff of the School for Advanced Studies in the Social Sciences
Members of the Académie des sciences morales et politiques
Commandeurs of the Légion d'honneur
Members of the Royal Netherlands Academy of Arts and Sciences
20th-century German people
German biblical scholars
French biblical scholars
New Testament scholars
Academic staff of the University of Paris
Alsatian-German people
Academic staff of the University of Basel
Academic staff of the University of Strasbourg
University of Strasbourg alumni
Lutheran biblical scholars
20th-century Lutherans
Corresponding Fellows of the British Academy